Rashmi Rocket is a 2021 Indian Hindi language sports drama film directed by Akarsh Khurana and produced by Ronnie Screwvala. It stars Taapsee Pannu as the titular character alongside Abhishek Banerjee and Priyanshu Painyuli. The film premiered on 15 October 2021 on ZEE5.

Cast 
 Taapsee Pannu as Rashmi Chibber aka Rashmi Rocket, an Indian track and field athlete from Bhuj in Kutch, Gujarat. Competitor at the Indian National Open Athletics Championships, 2014 Asian Games and the 2016 South Asian Games qualifiers. The character is based on several Indian sportswomen who were subject to gender testing due to being diagnosed with hyperandrogenism; such as Dutee Chand and Pinki Pramanik.
 Priyanshu Painyuli as Captain Gagan Thakur, Indian Army captain (later Major) and Rashmi's husband
 Abhishek Banerjee as Eeshit Mehta, Rashmi's lawyer
 Shweta Tripathi as Maya Bhasin
 Supriya Pathak as Bhanuben Chibber, Rashmi's mother
 Manoj Joshi as Ramnik Chibber, Rashmi's father, killed in the 2001 Bhuj earthquake
 Mantra as Coach Tejas Mukherji
 Supriya Pilgaonkar as Judge Savita Deshpande, judge at the Bombay High Court
 Miloni Jhonsa as Niharika Chopra, Dilip's daughter who's jealous of Rashmi
 Namita Dubey as Priyanka Kapoor
 Varun Badola as Dilip Chopra, Niharika's father and a Senior Selector
 Boloram Das as Coach
 Chirag Vora as Nileshbhai Virah Chibber
 Dharak Chhaya as Kartik Virah Chibber
 Dhwanish Chhaya as Paresh Virah Chibber
 Akash Khurana as Dr. Ejaz Qureshi
 Kshitee Jog as Dr. Jagdish Mahatre
 Zafar Karachiwala as Mangesh Desai
 Aseem Jayadev Hattangady as  Praveen Sood
 Umesh Jagtap as Inspector Jagan Sathe
 Akshay Taksale as Sub-Inspector Jagtap Rana
 Kritika Bharadwaj as Vaidehi Thakur

Production 
The principal photography began in November 2020 at FLAME University in Pune. The film was wrapped up on 26 January 2021 in Gujarat. Shooting locations included Bhuj and the Rann of Kutch in Gujarat as well as Ranchi in Jharkhand.

Soundtrack 

The film's music was composed by Amit Trivedi while lyrics written by Kausar Munir.

Critical reception
Anna M. M. Vetticad of Firstpost said “Here for a change is a Hindi film that knows how to portray male allies without allowing them to cross the line into male saviour territory. Here for a change is a Hindi film featuring female adversaries sans the all-women-are-enemies-of-women stereotype, and spotting female allies in unexpected places.”

Writing for Scroll, Nandini Ramnath said, “Light on its feet and often as fleet as Rashmi, the movie cruises along on the strength of several heart-warming scenes (many of them involving Rashmi’s tough-loving mother Bhanu), a foot-tapping folksy score by Amit Trivedi, and basic insights into the debate over hyperandrogenism that continues to rage in all manner of sport.”

Ronak Kotecha of The Times of India gave the film four stars and said, “Nanda Periyasamy’s riveting story, Aniruddha Guha’s sharp screenplay and Akarsh Khurana’s able direction, holds your attention right from the beginning until the end, where the race for justice is played out in a court.” About lead actor Taapsee Pannu, the publication said, “Taapsee Pannu once again proves her mettle, embodying Rashmi’s persona, physically and mentally. Her effort to celebrate Rashmi’s victory and endure her pain, is as real as it gets and the actress doesn’t miss the beat when it comes to making us root for her character.”

Shubhra Gupta, in her review of the film in Indian Express, wrote: "When you see Taapsee Pannu’s Rashmi fighting the good fight, for herself and for other athletes who have been done against in similar fashion, you want to cheer. For keeping sporting women on top, and for the very worthy cause."

In his review for Cinema Express, critic Avinash Ramachandran wrote: "It is brave of Taapsee to do a film where the battle against the system takes paramount importance, and rightly so."

Zee News said in its review that "Akarsh Khurana's Rashmi Rocket has an unconventional storyline that can greatly contribute to conversations around gender equality."

In her review for Mashable, Sushri Saha writes, "With strong performances led by Pannu and a well-written screenplay, the film does justice to the issues it raises and challenges."

Critic Shomini Sen, in her review for WIONews, wrote that Rashmi Rocket “is an important film. It treads on an unknown track and it shines because of its important message.”

Accolades

References

External links 
 
 Rashmi Rocket at ZEE5
 Rashmi Rocket at Bollywood Hungama

2020s Hindi-language films
Indian sports drama films
Indian LGBT-related films
Indian courtroom films
Fictional track and field athletes
Films about social issues in India
Films about sportspeople
Films about women in India
Films postponed due to the COVID-19 pandemic
Films not released in theaters due to the COVID-19 pandemic
2021 drama films
Films shot in Maharashtra
Films shot in Gujarat
Films shot in Jharkhand
Films set in Gujarat
Films set in Jharkhand
Films set in Maharashtra
Films set in Mumbai
Films set in 2001
Films set in 2014
Indian Army in films
Indian National Open Athletics Championships
2014 Asian Games
2016 South Asian Games
Films directed by Akarsh Khurana